A list of films produced in Turkey in the 1960s:

1960s

References

External links
 Turkish films at the Internet Movie Database

1960s
Lists of 1960s films
Films